There are 34 named rapids in Montana.  A rapid is a section of a river where the river bed has a relatively steep gradient causing an increase in water velocity and turbulence.  A rapid is a hydrological feature between a run (a smoothly flowing part of a stream) and a cascade. A rapid is characterised by the river becoming shallower and having some rocks exposed above the flow surface. As flowing water splashes over and around the rocks, air bubbles become mixed in with it and portions of the surface acquire a white colour, forming what is called "whitewater".  Rapids occur where the bed material is highly resistant to the erosive power of the stream in comparison with the bed downstream of the rapids.

 Big Horn River
 Sitting Bull Rapids, Big Horn County, Montana, el. 
 Clark Fork River
 Thibideau Rapids, Missoula County, Montana, el. 
 Missouri River
 Baker Rapids, Prairie County, Montana, el. 
 Bear Rapids, Blaine County, Montana, el. 
 Bird Rapids, Blaine County, Montana, el. 
 Black Bluff Rapids, Chouteau County, Montana, el. 
 Brunots Rapids, Cascade County, Montana, el. 
 Budels Rapids, Blaine County, Montana, el. 
 Castle Bluff Rapids, Blaine County, Montana, el. 
 Castle Bluffs Rapids, Blaine County, Montana, el. 
 Dauphin Rapids, Fergus County, Montana, el. 
 Deadman Rapids, Chouteau County, Montana, el. 
 Flennikens Rapids, Cascade County, Montana, el. 
 Gallatin Rapids, Fergus County, Montana, el. 
 Heron Rapids, Sanders County, Montana, location unknown, 
 Holmes Rapids, Chouteau County, Montana, el. 
 Kipps Rapids, Chouteau County, Montana, el. 
 Little Dog Rapids, Blaine County, Montana, el. 
 Lone Pine Rapids, Blaine County, Montana, el. 
 Lone Pine Rapids, Cascade County, Montana, el. 
 Magpie Rapids, Blaine County, Montana, el. 
 McKeevers Rapids, Blaine County, Montana, el. 
 Pablo Rapids, Chouteau County, Montana, el. 
 Picotts Rapids, Fergus County, Montana, el. 
 Pine Island Rapids, Cascade County, Montana, el. 
 The Big Eddy, Cascade County, Montana, el. 
 Big Timber Creek
 Thunder Rapids, Sweet Grass County, Montana, el. 
 Yellowstone River
 Buffalo Rapids, Custer County, Montana, el. 
 De Russys Rapids, Prairie County, Montana, el. 
 Dixons Rapids, Custer County, Montana, el. 
 McKeons Rapids, Prairie County, Montana, el. 
 Trout Rapids, Stillwater County, Montana, el. 
 White Island Rapids, Prairie County, Montana, el. 
 Wolf Rapids, Prairie County, Montana, el.

See also
 Rivers in Montana
 Waterfalls of Montana

Notes

Montana
Rivers of Montana
Rapids